Regina V. Burstow Regina V Ireland (1997) was the appeal of two presidential cases in English law with the question as to whether or not psychiatric injury was considered 'bodily harm' under Section 47 of the Offences Against the Person Act 1861.

Facts

R v Ireland 
R v Ireland consisted of Mr. Robert Ireland making a large number of telephone calls to three separate women. Ireland would not speak during the calls and rang often late at night. He was convicted under Section 47 Actual Bodily Harm of the Offences Against the Person Act 1861 and his case was appealed to the then presiding court, House of Lords.

R v Burstow 
In the case of R v Burstow, Anthony Burstow stalking and intimidation campaign against his ex-partner for eight months. Making silent phone calls, transmitting menacing messages, physically following her and photographing her and her family. The victim suffered a sever depressive illness as a result. Burstow was convicted of Grievous bodily harm contract to Section 20 of the Offences Against the Person Act 1861. He appealed his case to the House of Lords on the grounds that silence cannot amount to Assault or Bodily harm.

Ruling 
The defendant appealed, sending the case to the House of Lords which, pre-Constitutional Reform Act 2005 and the founding of the United Kingdom Supreme Court, was the highest court in the land.

The decision to convict the defendant Ireland was upheld by the House of Lords, finding assault in English law can be found without verbal interaction.

Lord Steyn said The decision in Burstow was that the word 'inflict' as in 'inflict bodily harm' can be interperated as 'caused' and thus does not require any proof of a direct application of force. As sever psychological illnesses could therefore become Grievous Bodily Harm even though no physical 'bodily force' was ever inflicted.

The Lords additionally noted that as an assault is the fear of violence, it must be a fear of immediate violence, as in 'within a minute or two'.

References

External links 

 House of Lords Judgement Index
 Offences Against The Person Act 1861

English law
English case law
Offences against the person
House of Lords cases